Arild Stokkan-Grande (born 5 April 1978 in Trondheim) is a Norwegian politician for the Labour Party (AP). He represents Nord-Trøndelag in the Norwegian Parliament, where he meets in the place of Bjarne Håkon Hanssen, who was appointed to a government position.

Parliamentary Committee duties 
2005 - 2009 member of the Standing Committee on Local Government and Public Administration.

External links

1978 births
Living people
Labour Party (Norway) politicians
Members of the Storting
Politicians from Nord-Trøndelag
People from Levanger
21st-century Norwegian politicians